Vanishing Trails is a 1920 American silent Western film serial directed by Leon De La Mothe. The film is considered to be lost.

Plot
As described in a summary in a film publication, the serial involves the mystery of the murder of William Stillman (Wells) and the finding of the heir to his fortune. Silent Joe (Farnum) arrives in an effort to discover the murderer and prove that he is the true heir. He and the heroine Lou (Anderson) have their adventures in the mountainous terrain with its "vanishing trails." They are aided by The Shadow (Orlamond), a demented scientist with his trained dog, and several remarkable, death-dealing inventions.

Cast
 Franklyn Farnum as Silent Joe
 Mary Anderson as Durant's Daughter, Lou
 L. M. Wells as William Stillman
 Duke R. Lee as Steve Durant
 Harry Lonsdale as Grandon
 Vester Pegg as Rankin
 William Orlamond as The Shadow
 Pedro León as Bully Drake
 Bud Osborne as Skip Brandt

See also
 List of film serials
 List of film serials by studio
 List of lost films

References

External links

 

1920 films
1920 Western (genre) films
1920 lost films
American silent serial films
American black-and-white films
Lost Western (genre) films
Lost American films
Silent American Western (genre) films
1920s American films